Charles Albert Coffin (December 31, 1844 – July 14, 1926) was an American businessman who was the co-founder and first president of General Electric corporation.

Early life
He was born in Fairfield, Maine, the son of Albert Coffin and his wife Anstrus (Varney). He married Caroline Russell of Holbrook, Massachusetts, and had three children.

Career
At age 18, he moved to Lynn, Massachusetts, to join his uncle Charles E. Coffin and his shoe company, at which 
he spent the next twenty years. Eventually he established his own shoe factory named Coffin and Clough in Lynn.

In 1883, he was approached by another Lynn businessman, Silas A. Barton, to bring to town a struggling electric company from New Britain, Connecticut, finance it and lead it. With the engineering work of Elihu Thomson and Edwin J. Houston, Coffin was able to build up the company, renamed Thomson-Houston Electric Company, to be an equal to Thomas Edison's companies.

Under Coffin, Thomson-Houston deployed power plants in the South, including two in Atlanta, Georgia, to run the electric lighting and in 1889, Joel Hurt's electric streetcar line.

When General Electric was formed from Thomson-Houston and Edison's companies, Coffin was its first chief executive officer.
The company was tested quickly during the Panic of 1893, where Coffin negotiated with New York banks to advance money in exchange for GE-owned utility stocks.

He established a duopoly of important electric patents with Westinghouse Electric in the late 1890s, and in 1901 established a research laboratory for the company.
Suggested by Charles Proteus Steinmetz, this was the first industrial research lab in the US.
He supported GE engineers in the adaptation and development of the Curtis steam turbine, which advanced electric power generation.
He retired from the board in 1922, and retained a large amount of GE stock. Upon his death in 1926, he was one of the wealthiest men in the world.

References

Further reading
Ingham, John N. Biographical Dictionary of American Business Leaders. Charles A. Coffin. Published 1983 Greenwood Publishing Group. Page 173
Hammond, John W.  Men and Volts: The Story of General Electric. Published 1941.
Passer, Harold C. The Electrical Manufacturers, 1875-1900. Published 1953
Collins, Jim. The 10 Greatest CEOs of All Time. The 10 Greatest CEOs Of All Time What these extraordinary leaders can teach today's troubled executives. - July 21, 2003
 Charles A. Coffin Biography at www.ge.com

1844 births
1926 deaths
American chief executives
American manufacturing businesspeople
Businesspeople from Maine
General Electric chief executive officers
General Electric people
People from Fairfield, Maine